Glen Ridge is a New Jersey Transit station at the intersection of Bloomfield Avenue and Ridgewood Avenue in Glen Ridge, Essex County, New Jersey along the Montclair-Boonton Line. Service through Glen Ridge comes from Hoboken Terminal and New York Penn Station and goes through to one of four termini, Bay Street (on weekends), Montclair State University, Dover and Hackettstown. The station depot is on-grade level with Ridgewood Avenue, with the platform and tracks below street-level.

History
Railroad service through Glen Ridge began in 1860 with the construction of a platform on the Newark and Bloomfield Railroad at Prospect Street (modern-day Ridgewood Avenue) known as Ridgewood. The tracks were built eight years prior and no service in the area began until a nearby flag stop opened for a private entrepreneur in 1857. The railroad built a new wooden station at Ridgewood Avenue in 1872, replacing that in 1887.

The platforms at Glen Ridge, along with the stations at Bloomfield and Watsessing Avenue stations along the Montclair Branch were all built in 1912 during a grade separation program by the Delaware, Lackawanna, and Western Railroad. The Glen Ridge station, like the Watsessing Avenue station, was set below street level. It is a contributing property to the Glen Ridge Historic District and the Operating Passenger Railroad Stations Thematic Resource.

Station layout
Glen Ridge's low-level side platforms are not accessible.

In popular culture
Glen Ridge the site of the train station scene in the 2003 film Mona Lisa Smile that starred Julia Roberts and in the film Far From Heaven.

See also
Benson Street station
National Register of Historic Places listings in Essex County, New Jersey

References

External links

 Station House from Google Maps Street View

Glen Ridge, New Jersey
NJ Transit Rail Operations stations
Railway stations in the United States opened in 1912
Railway stations in Essex County, New Jersey
Former Delaware, Lackawanna and Western Railroad stations
1912 establishments in New Jersey
Railway stations on the National Register of Historic Places in New Jersey